Kecai Township (Mandarin: 科才镇) is a township in Xiahe County, Gannan Tibetan Autonomous Prefecture, Gansu, China. In 2010, Kecai Township had a total population of 3,729: 1,913 males and 1,816 females: 933 aged under 14, 2,570 aged between 15 and 65 and 226 aged over 65.

References 

Township-level divisions of Gansu
Xiahe County
Towns in China